The 2020 WNBL Finals is the postseason tournament of the WNBL's 2019–20 season. The Canberra Capitals were the defending champions and they successfully defended their title, taking home their ninth WNBL Championship.

The WNBL Finals schedule was announced 2 February 2020.

Standings

Bracket

Semi-finals

(1) Southside Flyers vs. (4) Adelaide Lightning

(2) Canberra Capitals  vs. (3) Melbourne Boomers

Grand Final

(1) Southside Flyers vs. (2) Canberra Capitals

Rosters

References 

Women's National Basketball League Finals
Finals